The Legend Goes On is the twenty-third studio album by American country music group The Statler Brothers. It was released in 1982 via Mercury Records. The album peaked at number 17 on the Billboard Top Country Albums chart.

It was the group's final album to feature original tenor and guitarist Lew DeWitt before he was replaced by Jimmy Fortune.

Track listing
"Whatever" (Harold Reid, Don Reid) – 2:12
"I Had Too Much to Dream" (Kim Reid) – 2:39
"I Don't Know Why" (H. Reid, D. Reid) – 2:47
"Life's Railway to Heaven" (W.S. Stevenson) (Adapted & arranged by H. Reid, D. Reid, Lew DeWitt, Phil Balsley) – 2:36
"How Do You Like Your Dream So Far" (H. Reid, D. Reid) – 2:13
"A Child of the Fifties" (D. Reid) – 2:37
"That's When It Comes Home to You" (DeWitt) – 2:25
"I Don't Dance No More" (D. Reid) – 2:06
"What You Are to Me" (D. Reid) – 3:30
"(I'll Love You) All Over Again" (D. Reid) – 2:36

Chart performance

References

1982 albums
The Statler Brothers albums
Mercury Records albums
Albums produced by Jerry Kennedy